Jamie Carr (born 1982) is an Irish Gaelic footballer who plays in defence for Newtown Blues and the Louth county team.

He also played for Donegal Boston.

References

1982 births
Living people
Donegal Boston Gaelic footballers
Gaelic football backs
Louth inter-county Gaelic footballers
Newtown Blues Gaelic footballers